Government of the 27th Dáil may refer to
 23rd Government of Ireland (1993–94) Fianna Fáil and Labour
 24th Government of Ireland (1994–97) Fine Gael, Labour, and Democratic Left

Governments of Ireland